Simple Symmetric Transport Protocol (SSTP) is a protocol for delivering messages between clients and servers. It is used by Microsoft Groove.

References

External links
SSTP specification

Application layer protocols